This list includes all Ramsar sites in Scotland. Ramsar sites are internationally recognised wetland sites, protected under the terms of the Ramsar Convention, which was developed and adopted by participating nations at a meeting in Ramsar, Iran, on 2 February 1971. At the end of 2010, 160 states were contracting parties to the convention, and the worldwide total of sites was 1,920. The United Kingdom was one of 18 original signatories to the convention, and has since designated 168 Ramsar sites. 51 of these sites are within Scotland, including one site, the Upper Solway Flats and Marshes, which covers parts of both Scotland and England in the Solway Firth. All of Scotland's Ramsar sites form part of the European Natura 2000 network as either Special Protection Areas or Special Areas of Conservation, and many sites are further protected as Sites of Special Scientific Interest under UK legislation.

List of Ramsar sites in Scotland

See also
 Ramsar Convention
 List of Ramsar sites worldwide

References



 
Ramsar
Ramsar
Scotland